Pitshill is a Grade II* listed house built in the neoclassical style and is located within the Parish of Tillington a couple of miles west of Petworth. Begun by William Mitford in 1760 on the site of an earlier house it was completed by his son, also William, in 1794. It is considered to be one of the most important country houses in West Sussex.

The rectangular house of two stories with an attic and basement has a main east facing façade built in 1760 to a design by John Upton, the Petworth Estate surveyor. It is built in limestone ashlar with rusticated ground floor and a balustraded parapet over the side portions.

The remaining elevations are brick and render decorated to match the east front and were constructed in the 1790s to plans influenced but not completed by Sir John Soane. Further substantial works were carried out to the house in the 1830s as well as the later Nineteenth Century additions of a veranda and conservatory, these being removed in the 1950s leaving a classical style rectangular building.

The main house is augmented by two nineteenth century lodges, an 1840s stable block, a shell house,  probably late eighteenth century, all Grade II listed and standing within a Grade II listed park. in addition there is an ice house, also probably 18th century, and a late nineteenth century tower.

A public bridleway and public footpaths through the park give access for the public.

References

Country houses in West Sussex
Georgian architecture in England
Grade II listed buildings in West Sussex